Milkessa Chalchisa (born 2 June 1949) is an Ethiopian athlete. He competed in the men's javelin throw at the 1980 Summer Olympics.

References

1949 births
Living people
Athletes (track and field) at the 1980 Summer Olympics
Ethiopian male javelin throwers
Olympic athletes of Ethiopia
Place of birth missing (living people)